Ride the Tiger is the debut studio album by American indie rock band Yo La Tengo. It was released in 1986 by record label Coyote.

Production
The album was produced by Mission of Burma's Clint Conley. Dave Schramm plays guitar on the album.

Content 
The song "Big Sky" is a cover of The Kinks' song from their album The Kinks Are the Village Green Preservation Society. The song "A House Is Not a Motel" is a cover of Love's song from their album Forever Changes.

Critical reception
The Washington Post called the album "unpretentious and emotionally convincing," writing that the band's "chief asset is not [Ira] Kaplan's flat, intimate vocals, but their guitars, which are finely textured and finely tuned to the moody, personal resonances of their songs." Trouser Press wrote that "it’s originals like 'The Cone of Silence' and 'The Forest Green' that make Ride the Tiger such a pleasure."

Track listing

Personnel 
Yo La Tengo
 Ira Kaplan – vocals, guitar
 Dave Schramm – guitar, vocals on "The Way Some People Die" and "Five Years"
 Mike Lewis – bass guitar
 Georgia Hubley – drums

Additional personnel
 David Bither – saxophone on "Screaming Dead Balloons"
 Mike Tchang – saxophone on "The River of Water"
 Chris Nelson – trombone on "The River of Water"
 Clint Conley – bass guitar on "The Forest Green," "The Empty Pool," and "Alrock's Bells"
 Dave Rick – bass guitar on "The River of Water" and "A House Is Not a Motel"

Technical
 Ken French – engineering

References

External links 
 

1986 debut albums
Yo La Tengo albums
Jangle pop albums